The 1921–22 Idaho Vandals men's basketball team represented the University of Idaho during the  college basketball season. Members of the Pacific Coast Conference, the Vandals were led by second-year head coach  and played their home games on campus at the Armory and Gymnasium in Moscow, Idaho.

The PCC became an eight-team league this year with the addition of USC and Idaho; the Vandals won the season title, and repeated the next year. They were led on the court by captain Rich Fox; "Bullet" became the head coach five years later.

At the six-team National Tournament in Indianapolis, Idaho lost  in the quarterfinal to runner-up Kalamazoo.

Idaho (16–1) was also the champion of the Northwest Conference, which was the five teams of next year's PCC Northern Division plus Whitman, Willamette, and Montana. The only loss was at Montana, on a small floor.

Postseason result

|-
!colspan=5 style=| National Intercollegiate Basketball Tournament

References

External links
Sports Reference – Idaho Vandals: 1921–22 basketball season
Gem of the Mountains: 1923 (spring 1922) University of Idaho yearbook – 1921–22 basketball season
Idaho Argonaut – student newspaper – 1922 editions

Idaho Vandals men's basketball seasons
Idaho
Idaho
Idaho